Some Notes on H. P. Lovecraft is a collection of biographical notes about H. P. Lovecraft by writer August Derleth.  It was released in 1959 by Arkham House in an edition of 1,044 copies.

Contents

 "The Myths"
 "The Unfinished Manuscripts"
 "The Writing Habits"
 "The Barlow Journal"
 "H. P. Lovecraft: Four Letters"

Reprints
Folcroft, PA: Folcroft Press, 1971.[hardcover, library binding] 
Norwood, PA: Norwood Editions, 1976.[hardcover, library binding]
Philadelphia: R. West, 1977.
Darby, PA: Arden Library, 1980.
West Warwick, RI: Necronomicon Press, 1982.

References

1959 non-fiction books
Biographies about writers
American biographies
Works about H. P. Lovecraft